Greatest Hits is a compilation album by David Cassidy, initially released in 1974 by Bell Records.   

This album contains songs that were recorded during the first phase of David Cassidy's musical career. All of the songs contained in this collection were recorded between 1970 and 1974 during the time he was starring in The Partridge Family television series. Of the eleven songs contained in this compilation, three songs were taken from Partridge Family albums and the song "If I Didn't Care" had only been released as a single in Europe and was not available in the U.S. prior to this album. Also note that Could It Be Forever was not issued as noted on the album. Instead it was the B-side of that song called Blind Hope. Clearly an error.

Track listing

Side 1
"Cherish" (Terry Kirkman) – 3:46
"Doesn't Somebody Want to Be Wanted" (Wes Farrell, Jim Cretecos, Mike Appel) – 2:46
"Daydreamer'" (Terry Dempsy) – 2:46
"Please Please Me" (Live) (John Lennon, Paul McCartney) – 1:57
"Could It Be Forever" (Wes Farrell, Danny Janssen) – 2:16
"If I Didn't Care" (Jack Lawrence) – 3:16

Side 2
"How Can I Be Sure" (Felix Cavaliere, Eddie Brigati) – 3:06
"I Think I Love You" (Tony Romeo) – 2:52
"Rock Me Baby" (Johnny Cymbal, Peggy Clinger) – 3:52
"I Am a Clown" (Tony Romeo) – 4:35
"I'll Meet You Halfway" (Wes Farrell, Gerry Goffin) – 4:35

Production notes
Produced by Wes Farrell, except
"Please, Please Me" Produced by David Cassidy and Barry Ainsworth
"If I Didn't Care" Produced by David Cassidy and Michael Lloyd

Release notes
This album was released in United States in 1974 by Bell Records under the catalog number Bell 1321.
The catalog number was changed in 1976 to Arista 2014.

References

David Cassidy albums
1974 compilation albums
albums produced by Wes Farrell
Bell Records compilation albums